Nina Carter (born Penelope Jane Mallett on 4 October 1952) is an English former 1970s Page 3 girl and occasional singer.

Career
Carter had a cameo in the movie An American Werewolf in London featuring in a television advertisement for a kiss-and-tell article ("The Naked Truth About Naughty Nina") in the News of the World prior to David Naughton's first "transformation" into the titular beast.  Together with Jilly Johnson, she formed a musical duo, Blonde on Blonde, which was successful in Japan.

Personal life
Carter married former Yes keyboard player Rick Wakeman in 1984, and they divorced in 2004.

References
Citations

Bibliography

External links
 

1952 births
Living people
Page 3 girls
Life coaches